Serge Nikolaevich Padukow (23 October 1922 – 22 October 1993; last name variantly spelled as Padukow) was an American architect and engineer, sculptor, and human rights activist.

Sergey Padyukov was born in a Russian family in Brest, a Polish city at that time. He graduated Russian secondary school at Brest and together with parents was forced to move to Warsaw after Soviet invasion of Poland. At the end of World War II Padyukov's family found themselves in Munich in French occupation zone and Sergey started his high education at Ludwig Maximilian University of Munich. During this time he met and married Gerda (born 1925) who studied chemistry at the same university. Later Sergey Padyukov completed his education at Karlsruhe Institute of Technology and graduated as an architect. In 1954 Sergey Padyukov with family emigrated to USA and were living in Lakewood, NJ and later in Toms River, NJ. Sergey Padyukov received a license as an architect at Princeton University in 1960 and from 1965 he was a member of AIA. He introduced a new technology for construction of domes for church buildings from fiberglass and constructed (together with reconstruction of previously demolished buildings) 45 churches at USA and hundreds of civil buildings. Sergey Padyukov's style involved traditional Eastern Orthodox Church decorations, but also modern elements and use of modern materials. Four churches constructed by Sergey Padyukov were classified as buildings of historic or architectural merit.

List of buildings
St. Mary's Russian Orthodox Church at St. Vladimir's Cemetery, 1968, Jackson Township, New Jersey
St. Nicholas Orthodox Church, 1969, Whitestone, Queens, New York
St. Michael's Cathedral, 1976, Sitka, Alaska
St. Alexander Nevsky Cathedral, Pittsburgh, Pennsylvania
St. Thomas the Apostle Byzantine Catholic Church (the altar design), Rahway, New Jersey
St. Michael's Ukrainian Greek Catholic Church, 1984, Shenandoah, Pennsylvania
St. Barbara Greek Orthodox Church, 1986, Toms River, New Jersey
Second Baptist Church, 1980, Toms River, New Jersey
St. Vladimir Memorial Church, 1988, Jackson Township, New Jersey
Kimisis Tis Theotokou Greek Orthodox Church and Community Center, 1988, Holmdel Township, New Jersey, NJ 
Blessed Virgin Mary Russian Orthodox Church, McKeesport, Pennsylvania

Political activity

Sergey Padyukov and his older brother, Arkady, were members of National Alliance of Russian Solidarists, known as NTS. Arkady Padyukov was arrested and executed by NKVD in 1943 in Smolensk Oblast. Later, in USA, as a human rights activist, Sergey Padyukov was serving as an expert for American Security Council Foundation and Republican National Committee. He was a board member of Young Americans for Freedom Organization and a member of the Congress of Russian Americans. 
During perestroyka Sergey Padyukov established an active collaboration with political activists in Russia and regularly visited Moscow. He died after one of the visits at the end of 1993 in his home in Toms River, New Jersey.

References

Bibliography
 Andreev S. The Golden Domes of Sergey Padyukov // Rodina (Андреев С. Золотые купола Сергея Падюкова // Родина), 1993, no. 5–6. pp. 116–118.
 Radlo L. Between Two Evils: The World War II Memoir of a Girl in Occupied Warsaw and a Nazi Labor Camp, 2009, Jefferson, NC, McFarland & Company 
 Saint Michael the Archangel Russian Orthodox Church At: SAH Archipedia, eds. Gabrielle Esperdy and Karen Kingsley, Charlottesville: UVaP, 2012.

1922 births
1993 deaths
Architects from New Jersey
Polish emigrants to the United States
Fellows of the American Institute of Architects
Architects of cathedrals
20th-century American architects
People from Toms River, New Jersey
People from Lakewood Township, New Jersey